Jinya or Jin'ya may refer to the following:

People
Jinya Nishikata, Olympic ski jumper

Places

Japan 
Jin'ya, a type of headquarters in Japan
Takayama Jinya
Jinya Dam, Fukuoka, Japan

China 
Jinya, Yuzhong, town in Lanzhou, Gansu, China
Jinya, a town of Dachuan District, Dazhou, China
Dazhou Jinya Airport

Companies
Jinya Ramen Bar, ramen restaurant chain in the United States